The 1974 Spanish Grand Prix was a Formula One motor race held on 28 April 1974 at the Circuito Permanente del Jarama near Madrid, Spain. It was race 4 of 15 in both the 1974 World Championship of Drivers and the 1974 International Cup for Formula One Manufacturers.

The 84-lap race was won from pole position by Austrian driver Niki Lauda, driving a Ferrari. It was Lauda's first of 25 Formula One victories. Swiss teammate Clay Regazzoni finished second, with Brazilian Emerson Fittipaldi third in a McLaren-Ford.

Race summary 

With James Hunt's Hesketh having won the non-championship International Trophy three weeks previously, the 1974 season was turning out to be one of the most open ever, with five drivers from four teams having won the first five races (also including the non-championship Race of Champions), and a driver who had not won at all - Clay Regazzoni - leading the Drivers' Championship.

The Spanish Grand Prix marked the debuts of the Trojan and Amon teams, as well as Liechtensteiner driver Rikky von Opel. Jorge de Bagration, a local driver of Georgian royal descent, was to have taken part in the race, driving a Surtees TS16 with sponsorship from department store El Corte Inglés, but missed out due to a very unusual set of circumstances: the outgoing president of the Spanish Motor Sport Federation cleared his office, taking with him all paper files including the official entry list for the race; a replacement list was hurriedly drawn up that omitted de Bagration, whose sponsorship had just fallen through. Despite this, de Bagration should still have been included on the replacement list, regardless whether or not he would have been able to race.

Niki Lauda took pole from Ronnie Peterson in a qualifying session disrupted by a large accident to Patrick Depailler, but it was Peterson who led from the start as rain began to fall. Jacky Ickx moved into the podium places, taking 3rd place on lap 19.

As the track dried, cars dived into the pits for replacement tyres. Ferrari got Lauda in and out for a total pit stop time of 35 seconds, enabling him to take the lead. The race ended at the two-hour mark, six laps short of the scheduled 90, with Lauda leading Regazzoni home in a Ferrari 1-2 and no other driver on the lead lap. Arturo Merzario lost out on a solid points finish when the hit the wall in 4th. Emerson Fittipaldi held off a strong challenge from Hans-Joachim Stuck, whilst Jody Scheckter claimed his first points.

Classification

Qualifying

Race

Championship standings after the race

Drivers' Championship standings

Constructors' Championship standings

References

Spanish Grand Prix
Spanish Grand Prix
1974 in Spanish motorsport
Spanish